The Secunderabad East metro station is located on the Blue Line of the Hyderabad Metro. It is part of Corridor I of the Hyderabad Metro starting from Miyapur to Nagole.

History 
It was opened to the public on 28 November 2017.

Facilities 
Secunderabad East metro station is near to Secunderabad Junction railway station. There are free metro feeder services from Secunderabad East metro station to Secunderabad railway station. There is a foot overbridge between Secunderabad East Metro Station and TSRTC Rathifile Bus Station (Secunderabad). Secunderabad Railway Station is near to the bridge. A skywalk is under construction to connect Secunderabad railway station with Metro station. A specific gate number 5 on platform 1 of Secunderabad Junction railway station has been designated to direct people to the closest route to the metro station.

References

External links 
 Page at the Hyderabad Metro official website

Hyderabad Metro stations